Aditya Institute of Technology and Management (AITAM College) is a private college located in Tekkali, Srikakulam District of Andhra Pradesh State. The college was established in 2001.

References

AITAM College website
admissions in 2015-16(72.87 per cent) were filled SRIKAKULAM: AUGUST 03, 2015 00:00 IST – via www.thehindu.com.
According to Aditya Institute of Technology and Management Director (AITAM)-Tekkali Director V.V.Nageswara Rao - via thehindu.com
Engineering colleges woo students of Nepal and Bhutan - Via thehindu.com
AITAM students make smart helmet SRIKAKULAM:, SEPTEMBER 19, 2015 00:00 IST - via thehindu.com
Alumni to help AITAM in curriculum preparation SRIKAKULAM:, DECEMBER 30, 2014 00:52 IST - via thehindu.com
Focus on research, Startup Village founder tells students SRIKAKULAM:, FEBRUARY 15, 2015 00:00 IST - via thehindu.com
Plenty of opportunities to expand foreign trade from rural areas SRIKAKULAM:, MARCH 12, 2015 00:00 IST - via thehindu.com
AITAM students to study kidney ailments 6 Aug 2017 8:10 AM IST - via thehansindia.com
Gurukulam concept is still relevant: Chaganti SRIKAKULAM:, JANUARY 22, 2015 00:00 IST - via thehindu.com
Interact with experts to enhance knowledge SRIKAKULAM:, APRIL 09, 2015 00:00 IST  - via thehindu.com
10 years imprisonment for ragging, says DSP SRIKAKULAM, JULY 20, 2018 00:41 IST   - via thehindu.com
AITAM students set up online portals SRIKAKULAM:, MARCH 30, 2015 00:00 IST - via thehindu.com
Cashless campaign gets a push in Srikakulam SRIKAKULAM:, DECEMBER 17, 2016 00:17 IST -  via thehindu.com
Youngsters should set up industries: Collector SRIKAKULAM:, FEBRUARY 27, 2016 00:00 IST  - via thehindu.com
80,000 seats fall vacant in engineering counselling COIMBATORE:, JULY 29, 2013 02:28 IST   - via thehindu.com
AITAM college gets SKoch Order of Merit Award SRIKAKULAM:, APRIL 03, 2015 00:00 IST - via thehindu.com
AITAM students develop gearless go-kart SRIKAKULAM:, MARCH 24, 2016 00:00 IST - via thehindu.com

External links
AITAM Engineering College website

Engineering colleges in Andhra Pradesh
Educational institutions established in 2001
2001 establishments in Andhra Pradesh